Stena Metall AB is a company in the recycling industry that is also engaged in smelting metals, including aluminum. The recycled material is sold to various companies. Stena Metall AB operates in Sweden, Denmark, Norway, Finland, Poland, Italy, Germany, Switzerland and the United States of America. It is the oldest part of the Stena Sphere having been founded on November 18, 1939. The CEO is Kristofer Sundsgård. The previous CEO Anders Jansson retired in 2022 after having served in this role for 23 years. Anders Jansson had recently been criticized by the local press for calculating taxes differently than the local tax authorities in Sweden. Stena Metall AB owns more than 15 companies (directly or indirectly). Subsidiarity is an important value for in the company. The following chapters are each dedicated to one of the subsidiaries of Stena Metall AB:

Stena Recycling AB 
Through Stena Recycling AB, the company collects and processes scrap metal, plastic, paper, e-waste, spent batteries, hazardous waste and chemicals at about 173 sites in seven countries. The consulting arm of Stena Recycling AB helps companies to design more sustainable products. In 2021, Stena Recycling AB started to build facilities for the shredding of lithium-ion batteries. The Swedish Energy Agency decided to give Stena Recycling AB SEK 70.7 M in 2022 as subsidies for building a facility for treating waste batteries that are a crucial step to reduce reliance on fossil fuels; this facility is designed to shred about 10,000 Mg of lithium-ion batteries per year and produce recyclable materials from them. In 2022, a subsidiary of Stena Recycling AB sold its business with the recycling of heat exchangers in Germany to a subsidiary of Quantum Opportunity Fund II GmbH & Co. KG to focus its German business on the treatment of waste batteries. In the same year, Stena bought Encore Environmental Services Oy in Finland to grow its existing waste management business in the Nordic country.

Stena Trade & Industry AB 
Stena Trade & Industry AB is the owner of BatteryLoop Technologies AB that builds stationary energy storage systems from batteries that are designed for electric vehicles. BatteryLoop Technologies AB is cooperating with Bixia AB and One Nordic Holding AB to stabilize the Swedish energy grid. The products of BatteryLoop Technologies AB are tailored to owners and operators of real estate and logistics companies like ports. Some of BatteryLoop's first products was deployed in cooperation with Volvo Cars and Essity.

Stena Metal International AB 
Stena Metal International AB markets metal fractions produced by other subsidiaries of Stena Metall AB. The operations of this subsidiary include international trading in scrap.

Stena Stål AB 
Stena Stål delivers steel products in cooperation with steel producers. It has 15 locations in Sweden and another location in Norway. Its managing director is Stefan Svensson.

Stena Aluminium AB 
Stena Aluminium AB is based in Älmhult (Sweden). It produces about 300 different aluminium alloys for foundry customers in northern Europe. The managing director is Johan Thunholm.

Stena Oil AB 
Stena Oil AB sells bunker oil and takes care of oil sludge in cooperation with Stena Recycling. It trades in the North Sea and the passages between the North Sea and the Baltic Sea. The managing director of this subsidiary is Jonas Persson.

Stena Metal Inc. 
Stena Metal Inc. has its headquarter in Southport (Connecticut). It trades scrap metal, metal products, petroleum coke, and other raw materials. The managing director of Stena Metal Inc. is Doug Fried.

Stena Metall Finans AB 
Stena Metall Finans AB manages the finances of Stena Metall AB by investing in hedge funds and companies with relatively stable profit forecasts. It is considered the internal bank of Stena Metall AB. Its managing director is Peter Gustafsson.

See also
 Stena Sphere
 Stena Line

References

Recycling industry
Companies of Sweden